Ohio State Route 25 is an Ohio State Route that runs between Cygnet and Toledo.

Ohio State Route 25 may also refer to:
Ohio State Route 25 (1923-1927), now Ohio State Route 125, an east–west state highway in the southwestern portion of Ohio

See also
U.S. Route 25 in Ohio